Tal Ben-Shahar (Hebrew: טל בן-שחר; born 1970), also known as Tal David Ben-Shachar, is an American and Israeli teacher, and writer in the areas of positive psychology and leadership. As a lecturer at Harvard University, Ben-Shahar created the most popular course in Harvard's history. He has subsequently written several best-selling books and in 2011 co-founded Potentialife with Angus Ridgway, a company that provides leadership programs based on the science of behavioral change to organisations, schools and sports organisations globally.

Early life and education
Ben-Shahar received his PhD in Organizational Behavior from Harvard University.  His dissertation, completed in 2004, was titled "Restoring Self-Esteem's Self-Esteem: The Constructs of Dependent and Independent Competence and Worth." He has a bachelor's degree from Harvard in Philosophy and Psychology. His undergraduate thesis, completed in 1996, is titled "Honesty Pays: Bridging the Gap Between Moral Theory and Practice."

Career
Ben-Shahar consults and lectures internationally. Topics include leadership, education, ethics, happiness, self-esteem, resilience, goal setting, and mindfulness.

In 2011, Ben-Shahar co-founded Potentialife to bring positive psychology to people's daily lives.

He is the author of the international best sellers Happier and Being Happy, which have been translated into 25 languages.
 Being Happy: You Don't Have to Be Perfect to Lead a Richer, Happier Life (2010) originally published in hardcover as The Pursuit of Perfect (2010)
 Happier: Learn the Secrets to Daily Joy and Lasting Fulfillment (2007)
 A Clash of Values: The Struggle for Universal Freedom (2002)
 Heaven Can Wait: Conversations With Bonny Hicks (1998)

He has also written two children's books in collaboration with Shirly Yuval-Yair in Hebrew; one about Helen Keller and the other about Thomas Edison. The books aim to teach children about happiness.

He is the narrator of the 2012 documentary Israel Inside: How a Small Nation Makes a Big Difference, produced by Raphael Shore.

Ben-Shahar taught at Harvard, where his classes on Positive Psychology and The Psychology of Leadership were among the most popular courses in the university's history.

References

Books
Tal Ben-Shahar (2007) Happier: Learn the Secrets to Daily Joy and Lasting Fulfillment, McGraw-Hill Professional. 
Tal Ben-Shahar (2009) The Pursuit of Perfect: How to Stop Chasing Perfection and Start Living a Richer, Happier Life, McGraw-Hill Professional. 
Tal Ben-Shahar (2010) Even Happier: A Gratitude Journal for Daily Joy and Lasting Fulfillment, McGraw-Hill Professional.

External links
 https://www.happinessstudies.academy/
 Potentialife Limited
 Personal http://www.talbenshahar.com

Positive psychologists
Harvard College alumni
Academic staff of Reichman University
American self-help writers
1970 births
Living people
Israeli Jews
Jewish agnostics
Harvard Extension School faculty